The Great Plains Athletic Conference (GPAC) was a college athletic conference affiliated with the National Association of Intercollegiate Athletics (NAIA), operated in the western United States. It was aligned with the Rocky Mountain Athletic Conference (RMAC). The two allied conferences worked under the name of the Mountain and Plains Intercollegiate Athletic Association (MPIAA). It was announced on May 15, 1972. The founding schools were Fort Hays State College (now Fort Hays State University); Kansas State College of Emporia (now Emporia State University); Kansas State College of Pittsburg (now Pittsburg State University); Southern Colorado State College (now Colorado State University–Pueblo); the University of Nebraska at Omaha, the University of Northern Colorado and Washburn University. The conference only lasted four years, as Nebraska–Omaha and Northern Colorado left for the North Central Conference (NCC), Southern Colorado went back to the RMAC, and the rest of the schools started the Central States Intercollegiate Conference (CSIC), which merged into the Mid-America Intercollegiate Athletics Association (MIAA) effective in the 1989–90 school year.

Member schools

Final members

Notes

Membership timeline

Football champions
 1972 – 
 1973 –  and 
 1974 – 
 1975 –

References